Winter X Games XXII (re-titled Winter X Games Aspen '18; styled as Winter X Games Twenty-Two in the official logo) were held from January 25 to January 28, 2018, in Aspen, Colorado. They were the 17th consecutive Winter X Games held in Aspen. The events were broadcast on ESPN.

Participating athletes competed in six skiing events, seven snowboarding events, two snowmobiling events and two snow bike events.

Results

Medal count

Skiing

Women's SuperPipe results
Source:

Men's SuperPipe results
Source:

Women's SlopeStyle results
Source:

Men's Big Air results
Source:

Women's Big Air results
Source:

Men's SlopeStyle results
Source:

Snowboarding

Special Olympics Unified Snowboarding Dual Slalom results

Women's SlopeStyle results
Source:

Men's Big Air results
Source:

Women's Big Air results
Source:

Men's SlopeStyle results
Source:

Women's SuperPipe results
Source:

Men's SuperPipe results
Source:

Snowmobiling / BikeCross

Snowmobile Speed & Style results

Snowmobile Freestyle results
Source:

BikeCross results
Source:

Snow Bike Best Trick
Source:

Snow Bike Hill Climb

References

External links
 
X Games  Aspen official website

XXII
Multi-sport events in the United States
Skateboarding competitions
Skiing competitions in the United States
ESPN
Snowmobile racing
Annual sporting events in the United States